Genouillac is a commune in the Creuse department in the Nouvelle-Aquitaine region in central France.

Geography

Population

Sights
 The church of St. Pierre, dating from the thirteenth century.
 A disused railway viaduct of 16 stone arches.
 Traces of an ancient château.

See also
 Communes of the Creuse department

References

Communes of Creuse